Régis Barailla (28 August 1933 – 21 September 2016) was a French politician. He served as a member of the National Assembly from 1983 to 1993.

References

1933 births
2016 deaths
People from Aude
Politicians from Occitania (administrative region)
Socialist Party (France) politicians
Deputies of the 7th National Assembly of the French Fifth Republic
Deputies of the 8th National Assembly of the French Fifth Republic
Deputies of the 9th National Assembly of the French Fifth Republic